Nagykálló is a district in southern part of Szabolcs-Szatmár-Bereg County. Nagykálló is also the name of the town where the district seat is found. The district is located in the Northern Great Plain Statistical Region. This district is a part of Nyírség geographical region.

Geography 
Nagykálló District borders with Baktalórántháza District to the northeast, Nyírbátor District and Nyíradony District (Hajdú-Bihar County) to the east, Debrecen District and Hajdúhadház District (Hajdú-Bihar County) to the south, Nyíregyháza District to the west and north. The number of the inhabited places in Nagykálló District is 8.

Municipalities 
The district has 2 towns, 1 large village and 5 villages.
(ordered by population, as of 1 January 2013)

The bolded municipalities are cities, italics municipality is large village.

Demographics

In 2011, it had a population of 30,403 and the population density was 81/km².

Ethnicity
Besides the Hungarian majority, the main minorities are the Roma (approx. 1,500) and German (100).

Total population (2011 census): 30,403
Ethnic groups (2011 census): Identified themselves: 28,131 persons:
Hungarians: 26,504 (94.22%)
Gypsies: 1,220 (4.34%)
Others and indefinable: 407 (1.45%)
Approx. 2,500 persons in Nagykálló District did not declare their ethnic group at the 2011 census.

Religion
Religious adherence in the county according to 2011 census:

Catholic – 15,491 (Roman Catholic – 7,763; Greek Catholic – 7,728);
Reformed – 5,607;
Evangelical – 148;
other religions – 233;
Non-religious – 1,602; 
Atheism – 96;
Undeclared – 7,226.

Gallery

See also
List of cities and towns of Hungary

References

External links
 Postal codes of the Nagykálló District

Districts in Szabolcs-Szatmár-Bereg County